Harry Challis (19 April 1906 – 25 November 1989) was an Australian rules footballer who played with Fitzroy in the Victorian Football League (VFL).

Notes

External links 
		

1906 births
1989 deaths
Australian rules footballers from Victoria (Australia)
Fitzroy Football Club players